Sidney Austyn Paul Kitcat (20 July 1868 – 17 June 1942) was an English cricketer. He played for Gloucestershire between 1890 and 1904.

Life
Sidney Kitcat was the seventh child and third son of the Reverend David Kitcat, Rector of Westonbirt, near Tetbury, Gloucestershire. He was educated at Marlborough College, where he captained the First XI in 1886. After an incident in a school match when he was controversially dismissed, the Marylebone Cricket Club changed the Laws of Cricket to make it illegal for a bowler to bowl consecutive overs.

W. G. Grace saw Kitcat playing for Marylebone Cricket Club and asked him to join Gloucestershire, Grace's county team. He played as an amateur, fitting county matches in when the demands of his business allowed. His highest score was 95 not out against Middlesex at Lord's in 1897. Against Sussex in 1896, he and Grace, who made 301, added 193 for the ninth wicket; Kitcat made 77 not out.

He was also an international hockey player. In 1896 he married a widow, Mabel Murray Hickson, a writer of short stories.

References

1868 births
1942 deaths
English cricketers
English male field hockey players
Gloucestershire cricketers
People from Tetbury
People educated at Marlborough College
Marylebone Cricket Club cricketers
North v South cricketers
Gentlemen cricketers
Sportspeople from Gloucestershire